Robert Reid (May 27, 1898 – April 11, 1990) was an American cross-country skier. He competed in the men's 50 kilometre event at the 1932 Winter Olympics.

References

1898 births
1990 deaths
American male cross-country skiers
Olympic cross-country skiers of the United States
Cross-country skiers at the 1932 Winter Olympics
People from Berlin, New Hampshire